Daphnella sigmastoma is a species of sea snail, a marine gastropod mollusk in the family Raphitomidae.

Description
The length of the shell attains 8.5 mm, its diameter 3 mm.

(Original description) The small shell has an elongate-fusiform shape. Its colour is uniform pale yellow, except the apex, which is buff. The shell contains ten rounded whorls, including those of the elevated protoconch. The fasciole is narrow, excavate, and crossed by close-set scales. The radials are arcuate round-backed riblets, parted by interstices of equal breadth, fading out on the base, absent behind the varix, amounting to thirteen on the antepenultimate whorl The spirals are close narrow threads, alternating in size on the peripheral area, and over-riding the riblets. On the body whorl there are twenty-five, of which ten ascend the penultimate. The aperture is fortified by a broad and high varix, from which a free limb reaches across the aperture, reducing the width of the aperture. The sinus is a long and narrow fold. Within the outer lip and beneath the sinus are two small denticules. The columella is perpendicular. The siphonal canal is short and wide.

Distribution
This marine species is endemic to Australia and occurs off Queensland.

References

 Brazier, J. 1876. A list of the Pleurotomidae collected during the Chevert expedition, with the description of the new species. Proceedings of the Linnean Society of New South Wales 1: 151–162

External links
 SeaLifeBase
 

sigmastoma
Gastropods described in 1922
Gastropods of Australia